Samuel Osborn  (15 April 1848, London – 16 April 1936, Datchet, Buckinghamshire) was a British general surgeon, chief surgeon to the metropolitan corps of the St John Ambulance Brigade, obstetrician, gynaecologist, and author.

The only son of Samuel Osborn (1814–1869), FRCS, the junior Samuel Osborn was educated at Epsom College and at Wren's (a "crammer" for the British army examinations) and then entered St Thomas' Hospital, where he was a house surgeon and for five years an anesthetist. He qualified LSA in 1870 and MRCS in 1871 and was elected FRCS in 1876. He was a surgeon in Royal Navy Artillery Volunteers for 12 years. From 1880 to 1922 he was surgeon to the Surgical Appliance Association and to the Metropolitan Convalescent Institution. He assisted John Furley in forming the St John Ambulance Association. Osborn served in 1897 with a Greek ambulance service during the Greco-Turkish war, in 1899 with Methuen's infantry division during the South African war, and in 1912 with the Turkish army as surgeon to the Red Crescent during the Balkan War.

Between 1914 & 1918, he became the M.O. (medical officer) for the Countess of Dundonald hospital in London.

Osborn received many medals and honours. He was Justice of the Peace for Buckinghamshire. From 1919 to 1920 he was Master of the Society of Apothecaries. He married in 1884; the marriage produced a daughter, an only child.

Selected publications
 On the treatment of hydrocele, The Retrospect of Practical Medicine and Surgery, 1877, 75, 172–174
 On the corpus Morgagni, with reference to diseases of the testicle. St Thos Hosp Rep 1874, 5, 73–84.
 On the different forms of hydrocele of the tunica vaginalis. St This Hosp Rep 1876, 7, 101–118.
 Notes on diseases of the testis. London, 1880.
 Annotations on anaesthetics. St Thos Hosp Rep 1880, 10, 49, and 1882, 11, 23.
 Ambulance lectures: first aid to the injured. London, 1885.
 Ambulance lectures on home nursing and hygiene. London 1885; 2nd edition, 1891
 Premiers secours à donner aux malades et aux blesses. Paris, 1894.

References

1848 births
1936 deaths
People educated at Epsom College
Fellows of the Royal College of Surgeons
Royal Army Medical Corps officers
British Army personnel of World War I
Physicians of St Thomas' Hospital